Baisha is a town of Changning, Hunan, China. , it has two residential communities and 15 villages under its administration.

References

Towns of Hunan
Changning, Hunan